Keizer may refer to:

 Keizer (surname)
 Keizer (artist), a street artist in Cairo, Egypt
 Keizer, Oregon
 The Dutch word for an emperor or caesar
Salem-Keizer Volcanoes, minor league baseball team from Keizer, Oregon

See also
 Keyser (disambiguation)
 Kaiser